Sotol is a distilled spirit from the Chihuahuan desert (northern Mexico, western Texas) sourced from the family of Asparagaceae; the genus Dasylirion and several species, most commonly:  Dasylirion wheeleri, Dasylirion durangense, Dasylirion cedrosanum, and Dasylirion leiophyllum, less commonly with Dasylirion texanum and Dasylirion lucidum (commonly known as Desert Spoon or, in Spanish, sotol, sereque, cucharilla, or palmilla), a plant that grows in the Chihuahua desert of northern Mexico, New Mexico, Arizona, and west and central Texas. Sotol liquor is a Mexican drink that is known as the state spirit of Chihuahua, Durango and Coahuila. Sotol has its own appellation of origin since 2002, and may be produced only in Chihuahua, Coahuila and Durango. There are dozens of commercial examples available.
Production of sotol spirits exists outside the Sotol Denomination of Origin in several regions such as Sonora where it is known as Palmilla, Oaxaca (Cucharillo), and the Texas Hill Country (Texas Sotol).

It is produced in a manner similar to the more common artisanal mezcals of central Mexico.

History

The Indigenous People of the Chihuahuan Desert, such as the Jumano Pueblos and the Lipan Apache have made this traditional drink for centuries. Other Natives of Chihuahua, such as the Rarámuri, fermented sotol juice into a beer-like alcoholic beverage as early as 800 years ago. In the 16th century, Spanish colonists introduced European distillation techniques to produce a spirit. Sotol is now beginning to achieve international recognition like its cousins, mezcal and tequila. 

The beverage was illegal in Mexico until 1994, and it was granted a denomination of origin (DO) in 2002. According to the DO authorized by the Mexican Institute of Industrial Property, Sotol can only be produced in Chihuahua, Coahuila, and Durango. In 2020 The United States refrained from recognizing Mexico's DO during the final drafting of the United States–Mexico–Canada Agreement. This edit was made at the request of Texas Senator John Cornyn. Distilleries in Texas produce the spirit under the same name, to the chagrin of Mexican Sotoleros, the  Mexican state and Federal governments, and their supporters. Accusations of unsustainable harvesting of the Dasylirion plants, and cultural appropriation are the principle criticisms. One Mexican sotolero stated “The Americans can make what they want, but they cannot call it sotol, Sotol belongs to us.”

Production

The Desert Spoon takes approximately 15 years to mature and yields only one bottle of sotol per plant. It typically grows on rocky slopes in the Chihuahuan desert grassland between 3,000 and 6,500 feet above sea level. Unlike agave, which flowers only once in its lifetime, sotols produce a flower stalk every few years. Once the plant matures, it is harvested like agave plants when mezcal or tequila are to be made. The outer leaves are removed to reveal the center core, which is taken back to the distillery. The core can then be cooked and/or steamed, shredded, fermented, and distilled.

Types
Age classifications:
 Plata – Un-aged, straight from distillation to the bottle.
 Reposado (rested) – Aged several months to a year.
 Añejo – Aged for at least one year

References

External links
Reviews of several commercially produced brands of Sotol.
Presence in American Market.

Mexican distilled drinks
Mexican Designation of Origin
Distilled drinks
+